David Per (born 13 February 1995 in Dolenje Kronovo) is a Slovenian cyclist, who currently rides for UCI Continental team .

Major results

2012
 National Junior Road Championships
1st  Time trial
2nd Road race
2013
 National Junior Road Championships
1st  Time trial
3rd Road race
 1st  Overall Oberösterreich Juniorenrundfahrt
1st Stage 2
 2nd Overall Tour of Istria
1st Stage 1
 6th Overall Trofeo Karlsberg
 9th Trofeo Guido Dorigo
2014
 1st  Time trial, National Under-23 Road Championships
 5th Overall Tour of Al Zubarah
1st  Young rider classification
2015
 1st  Time trial, National Under-23 Road Championships
2016
 1st Ronde van Vlaanderen Beloften
 2nd GP Laguna
 National Road Championships
3rd Time trial
3rd Road race
 4th Kattekoers
 4th GP Adria Mobil
2018
 6th Time trial, National Road Championships
2019
 4th GP Adria Mobil
2021
 4th GP Slovenia
 4th GP Czech Republic
 5th GP Adria Mobil
 7th GP Kranj
2022
 9th GP Adria Mobil

References

External links

1995 births
Living people
Slovenian male cyclists